Marshall Lynn Edwards (born August 27, 1952), is a former professional baseball outfielder. He played in three seasons in the major leagues from  until , all for the Milwaukee Brewers. In the fifth and final game of the 1982 ALCS, Edwards subbed for a limping Gorman Thomas in center field in the 8th inning, and made a spectacular catch at the warning track of a deep fly ball off the bat of Don Baylor, helping preserve Milwaukee's narrow margin victory over the California Angels.

Edwards has two brothers who also played in the major leagues, Dave Edwards and Mike Edwards, who is Marshall's twin.

Edwards is retired from baseball and works as a minister at the World Changes International Church.

External links

Major League Baseball outfielders
Baseball players from Washington (state)
Milwaukee Brewers players
1952 births
Living people
UCLA Bruins baseball players
African-American baseball players
21st-century African-American people
20th-century African-American sportspeople
American expatriate baseball players in Canada
Charlotte O's players
Holyoke Millers players
Miami Orioles players
Vancouver Canadians players
Jefferson High School (Los Angeles) alumni